The Wagner Group, also known as PMC Wagner, is a Russian paramilitary organization. It is variously described as a private military company (PMC), a network of mercenaries, or a de facto private army of Russian President Vladimir Putin. The group operates beyond the law in Russia, where private military contractors are officially forbidden. While the Wagner Group itself is not ideologically driven, various elements of Wagner have been linked to neo-Nazism and far-right extremism.

The group came to prominence during the Donbas war in Ukraine, where it helped pro-Russian separatist forces of the self-declared Donetsk and Luhansk People's Republics from 2014 to 2015. Its contractors have reportedly taken part in various conflicts around the world, including the civil wars in Syria, Libya, the Central African Republic, and Mali, often fighting on the side of forces aligned with the Russian government. Wagner operatives have committed war crimes in areas where they are deployed. The accusations include rapes and robberies of civilians, and torturing accused deserters.

Because it operates in support of Russian interests, receives military equipment from the Russian Ministry of Defence (MoD) and uses installations of MoD for training, Wagner Group is frequently considered a de facto unit of the MoD or Russia's military intelligence agency, the GRU.

It is widely speculated that the Wagner Group is used by the Russian government to allow for plausible deniability in certain conflicts, and to obscure from public the number of casualties and financial costs of Russia's foreign interventions. It has played a significant role in the Russian invasion of Ukraine, where, among other activities, it has been reportedly deployed to assassinate Ukrainian leaders, and has recruited prisoners and convicts for frontline combat. In December 2022, Pentagon's John Kirby claimed Wagner group has 50,000 fighters in Ukraine, including 10,000 contractors and 40,000 convicts. Others put the number of recruited prisoners at more than 20,000, with the overall number of PMCs present in Ukraine estimated at 20,000.

After years of denying links to the Wagner group, Yevgeny Prigozhin, a businessman with close links to Putin, admitted in September 2022 that he "founded" the paramilitary group.

Origins and leadership

The Wagner Group first appeared in Ukraine in 2014, where it participated in the annexation of Crimea. The group was also active in 2014, fighting with Russia-backed separatists in the Luhansk region of Ukraine. Dmitriy Valeryevich Utkin, a veteran of the First and Second Chechen Wars, reportedly founded the group. Until 2008 or 2013, Utkin served as lieutenant colonel and brigade commander of a unit of special forces of Russia's Main Intelligence Directorate (GRU), the 700th Independent Spetsnaz Detachment of the 2nd Independent Brigade. After leaving the military, he began working in 2013 for the Moran Security Group, a private company founded by Russian military veterans, which was involved in security and training missions worldwide, and specializes in security against piracy. The same year, senior Moran Security Group managers were involved in setting up the Hong Kong-based Slavonic Corps, which headhunted contractors to "protect oil fields and pipelines" in Syria during its civil war. Utkin was deployed in Syria as a member of the Slavonic Corps, surviving its disastrous mission. Subsequently, Russia's Federal Security Service arrested some members of the Slavonic Corps for illegal mercenary activity.

In 2021, the Foreign Policy report noted the origin of the name "Wagner" to be unknown. Others say the group's name comes from Utkin's own call sign "Wagner", reportedly after the German composer Richard Wagner, which Utkin is said to have chosen due to his passion for the Third Reich (Wagner being Adolf Hitler's favorite composer). As such, some believe he is a neo-Nazi, with The Economist reporting that Utkin has several Nazi tattoos. Members of Wagner Group say Utkin is a Rodnover, a believer of Slavic native faith. Radio Liberty cited insiders as saying that the leadership of the Wagner Group are followers of the Slavic Native Faith, a modern Pagan new religious movement. In August 2017, the Turkish newspaper  speculated that Utkin was possibly a figurehead for the company, while the real head of Wagner was someone else.

Various elements of Wagner have been linked to white supremacist and neo-Nazi far-right extremists, such as Wagner's openly far-right and neo-Nazi Rusich unit, and Wagner members have left neo-Nazi graffiti on the battlefield. However, Erica Gaston, a senior policy adviser at the UN University Centre for Policy Research, noted that the Wagner Group is not ideologically driven, but rather a network of mercenaries "linked to the Russian security state". Russia denies the connection and officially the group does not exist.

In December 2016, Utkin was photographed with Russian President Vladimir Putin at a Kremlin reception given in honour of those who had been awarded the Order of Courage and the title Hero of the Russian Federation (to mark the ), along with Alexander Kuznetsov,  and Andrei Troshev. Kuznetsov (call sign "Ratibor") was said to be the commander of Wagner's first reconnaissance and assault company, Bogatov was the commander of the fourth reconnaissance and assault company, and Troshev served as the company's "executive director". A few days after, Kremlin spokesman Dmitry Peskov confirmed the presence of Utkin at the reception, stating that Utkin was from the Novgorod Region and had received the award, but could not say for what except that it was presumably for courage. Peskov stated he was not aware how famous Utkin was.

It has been reported that Russian businessman Yevgeny Prigozhin—sometimes called "Putin's chef", because of his catering businesses that hosted dinners which Vladimir Putin attended with foreign dignitaries— has links with Wagner and Utkin personally. The businessman has been said to be the funder and actual owner of the Wagner Group. Prigozhin denied any communication with Wagner, until September 2022, when he admitted having created the group in a post at VKontakte. Prigozhin claimed, "I cleaned the old weapons myself, sorted out the bulletproof vests myself and found specialists who could help me with this. From that moment, on May 1, 2014, a group of patriots was born, which later came to be called the Wagner Battalion." Previously, Prigozhin had sued Bellingcat, Meduza, and Echo of Moscow for reporting his links to the mercenary group.

In 2019, as the presence of Wagner PMCs in Africa was growing, a planned trip by Utkin to Rwanda was reportedly cancelled at the last moment. He was supposed to travel with Valery Zakharov, a Russian security advisor to the President of the Central African Republic. Subsequently, it was thought that Utkin was withdrawn from the Wagner Group's African operations due to his over-exposure that was the result of the medal-awarding ceremony at the Kremlin in 2016, and the United States sanctions imposed on him. Subsequently, Colonel Konstantin Aleksandrovich Pikalov (call sign "Mazay") was said to have been put in charge of Wagner's African operations. According to another report, there was a change in leadership in the Wagner Group due to changes in the methodology and direction of its work, with Utkin leaving the group and Konstantin Pikalov becoming the new head of the organization. Another theory was that Dmitry Utkin may have been killed, as his phone number was no longer functioning and his regular trips from Krasnodar to St. Petersburg stopped.

Pikalov served as a military officer in Russia's experimental military unit numbered 99795, located in the village of Storozhevo, near St. Petersburg, which was tasked, in part, with "determining the effects of radioactive rays on living organisms". Following his retirement, he continued to live on the military base at least until 2012 and ran a private detective agency. In the autumn of 2014, along with a large group of cossacks, he possibly took part in suppressing opponents of the Russian-supported President of Republika Srpska Milorad Dodik during the Republika Srpska general election in Bosnia and Herzegovina. Dodik won the re-election. Between 2014 and 2017, Pikalov traveled several times to destinations near the Ukrainian border, sometimes on joint bookings with known Wagner officers. In 2016, he ran for office in local council elections in the district of his military base near St. Petersburg on behalf of the pro-Kremlin A Just Russia party. However, his participation was denied by Russia's Central Election Committee, possibly due to his criminal record, as his name is listed on a Central Bank blacklist with a note that he was "a suspect in money laundering", although his current criminal file is blank. According to Bellingcat, this could mean either that the suspicion did not result in criminal charges, or that the records were purged. Former employees of Prigozhin interviewed on the condition of anonymity by Bellingcat stated Pikalov was known to have taken part in military operations in both Ukraine and Syria.

Organization

In early 2016, Wagner had 1,000 employees, which later rose to 5,000 by August 2017, and 6,000 by December 2017. The organization was said to be registered in Argentina and also has offices in Saint Petersburg and Hong Kong.

In early October 2017, the SBU said that Wagner's funding in 2017 had been increased by 185 million rubles ($3.1 million) and that around forty Ukrainian nationals were working for Wagner, with the remaining 95 percent of the personnel being Russian citizens. One Ukrainian was killed in Syria while fighting in the ranks of Wagner in March 2016, and three were reported overall to have died that spring. Armenians, Kazakhs and Moldovans have also worked for Wagner.

Following the deployment of its contractors between 2017 and 2019, to Sudan, the Central African Republic, Madagascar, Libya and Mozambique, the Wagner Group had offices in 20 African countries, including Eswatini, Lesotho and Botswana, by the end of 2019. Early in 2020, Erik Prince, founder of the Blackwater private military company, sought to provide military services to the Wagner Group in its operations in Libya and Mozambique, according to The Intercept. By March 2021, Wagner PMCs were reportedly also deployed in Zimbabwe, Angola, Guinea, Guinea Bissau, and possibly the Democratic Republic of Congo.

Recruitment and training
The barracks at the base are officially not linked to the Russian MoD, with court documents describing them as a children's vacation camp. According to a report published by Russian monthly , the organisation that hired personnel for Wagner did not have a permanent name and had a legal address near the military settlement  in Krasnogorsk, near Moscow. In December 2021, New Lines magazine analyzed data about 4,184 Wagner members who had been identified by researchers at the Ukrainian Center of Analytics and Security, finding that the average age of a Wagner contractor is forty years old and that the PMCs came from as many as fifteen different countries, though the majority were from Russia.

When new PMC recruits arrive at the training camp, they are no longer allowed to use social network services and other Internet resources. Company employees are not allowed to post photos, texts, audio and video recordings or any other information on the Internet that was obtained during their training. They are also not allowed to tell anyone their location, whether they are in Russia or another country. Mobile phones, tablets and other means of communication are left with the company and issued at a certain time with the permission of their commander. Passports and other documents are surrendered and in return company employees receive a nameless dog tag with a personal number. The company only accepts new recruits if a 10-year confidentiality agreement is established and in case of a breach of the confidentiality the company reserves the right to terminate the employee's contract without paying a fee. According to the Security Service of Ukraine (SBU), Russian military officers are assigned the role of drill instructors for the recruits. During their training, the PMCs receive $1,100 per month.

The pay of Wagner private military contractors (PMCs), who are usually retired regular Russian servicemen aged between 35 and 55, is estimated to be between 80,000 and 250,000 Russian rubles a month (667–2,083 USD). One source stated the pay was as high as 300,000 (US$2,500).

In late 2019, a so-called Wagner code of honor was revealed that lists ten commandments for Wagner's PMCs to follow. These include, among others, to protect the interests of Russia always and everywhere, to value the honor of a Russian soldier, to fight not for money, but from the principle of winning always and everywhere.

With increasing casualties on both sides in the war in Ukraine, the Russian government used the Wagner Group for recruitment. The NGO "Meduza" reported that the Russian Defense Ministry had taken control of Wagner's networks and was using its reputation for recruitment, but that the requirements had been reduced, with drug tests also reportedly not being done before duty. According to British intelligence, since July 2022 at the latest, the Wagner Group has been trying to recruit inmates from Russian prisons in order to alleviate the lack of cadres. In return for agreeing to fight in Ukraine, the criminals are promised a shortening of the sentence and monetary remuneration. BBC Russian Service reported that according to jurists, it is not legal to send inmates to war.

The Wagner Group reportedly recruited imprisoned UPC rebels in the Central African Republic to fight in Mali and Ukraine. They are reportedly nicknamed the "Black Russians".

Units
Rusich unit

The Wagner Group includes a contingent known as Rusich, or Task Force Rusich, referred to as a "sabotage and assault reconnaissance group", which has been fighting as part of the Russian separatist forces in eastern Ukraine. Rusich are described as a far-right extremist or neo-Nazi unit, and their logo features a Slavic swastika. The group was founded by Alexey Milchakov and Yan Petrovsky in the summer of 2014, after graduating from a paramilitary training program run by the Russian Imperial Legion, the fighting arm of the Russian Imperial Movement. As of 2017, the Ukrainian Prosecutor General and the International Criminal Court (ICC) were investigating fighters of this unit for alleged war crimes committed in Ukraine.

Serb unit
Wagner is believed to have a Serb unit, which was, until at least April 2016, under the command of Davor Savičić, a Bosnian Serb who was a member of the Serb Volunteer Guard (also known as Arkan's Tigers) during the Bosnian War and the Special Operations Unit (JSO) during the Kosovo War. His call sign in Bosnia was "Elvis". Savičić was reportedly only three days in the Luhansk region when a BTR armored personnel carrier fired at his checkpoint, leaving him shell-shocked. After this, he left to be treated. He was also reported to had been involved in the first offensive to capture Palmyra from the Islamic State (ISIL) in early 2016. One member of the Serbian unit was killed in Syria in June 2017, while the SBU issued arrest warrants in December 2017, for six Serbian PMCs that belonged to Wagner and fought in Ukraine, including Savičić. In early February 2018, the SBU reported that one Serb member of Wagner, who was a veteran of the conflict in Syria, had been killed while fighting in eastern Ukraine. In January 2023, Serbian president Aleksandar Vučić criticised Wagner for recruiting Serbian nationals and called on Russia to put an end to the practice, noting that it is illegal under Serbian law for Serbian citizens to take part in foreign armed conflicts.

Níðhöggr unit
It has been reported that the Wagner group has a small group of Norwegian, and Scandinavian citizens integated amongst its ranks. The unit is referred to as the "Níðhöggr", sometimes also known as Nidhogg, correlating to a dragon that is well-known in Norse mythology and has been seen upon various patches of this unit within the Wagner group. 

After fleeing from Russia on January 13, 2023, the Concord group stated that Andrey Medvedev worked in the Norwegian battalion of the Wagner PMC, which is called Nidhogg.

Relationship with the Russian state
Russian and some Western observers believe that the organization does not actually exist as a private military company but is in reality a disguised branch of the Russian MoD that ultimately reports to the Russian government. The company shares bases with the Russian military, is transported by Russian military aircraft, and uses Russia's military health care services. The Russian state is also documented supporting the Wagner Group with passports.

Private military companies are not legally allowed in Russia; nevertheless, a number of them appear to have been operating in Russia, and in April 2012 Vladimir Putin, then Russian prime minister, speaking in the State Duma, endorsed the idea of setting up PMCs in Russia. Several military analysts described Wagner as a "pseudo-private" military company that offers the Russian military establishment certain advantages such as ensuring plausible deniability, public secrecy about Russia's military operations abroad, as well as about the number of losses. Thus, Wagner contractors have been described as "ghost soldiers", due to the Russian government not officially acknowledging them.

In March 2017, Radio Liberty characterized the PMC Wagner as a "semi-legal militant formation that exists under the wing and on the funds of the Ministry of Defence". In September 2017, the chief of Ukraine's Security Service (SBU) Vasyl Hrytsak said that, in their opinion, Wagner was in essence "a private army of Putin" and that the SBU were "working on identifying these people, members of Wagner PMC, to make this information public so that our partners in Europe knew them personally". The Wagner Group has also been compared with Academi, the American security firm formerly known as Blackwater.

According to the SBU, Wagner employees were issued international passports in bulk by the GRU via Central Migration Office Unit 770–001 in the second half of 2018, allegations partially verified by Bellingcat.

In an interview in December 2018, Russian President Putin said, in regard to Wagner PMC's operating in Ukraine, Syria and elsewhere, that "everyone should remain within the legal framework" and that if the Wagner group was violating the law, the Russian Prosecutor General's Office "should provide a legal assessment". But, according to Putin, if they did not violate Russian law, they had the right to work and promote their business interests abroad. The president also denied allegations that Yevgeny Prigozhin had been directing Wagner's activities.

In September 2022 Prigozhin officially admitted to founding and managing "Wagner Group" which started as a batallion participating from May 2014 on the Russian side in the war in Donbass.

According to a Russia investigative media "Russkiy Kriminal", the military command of "Wagner" is held directly by GRU, including its current head Igor Kostyukov and former head of Russian SSO Aleksey Dyumin, with Prigozhin being responsible for its business administration. "Wagner" is mostly populated by current and former GRU operatives, and used for operations where direct GRU participation is undesirable.

Sanctions
Prigozhin was sanctioned by the United States Department of the Treasury in December 2016 for Russia's involvement in the Ukraine conflict, and by the European Union (EU) and the United Kingdom in October 2020 for links to Wagner activities in Libya.

The U.S. Department of the Treasury also imposed sanctions on the Wagner Group and Utkin personally in June 2017. The designation of the U.S. Department of the Treasury's Office of Foreign Assets Control listed the company and Dmitriy Utkin under the "Designations of Ukrainian Separatists (E.O. 13660)" heading and referred to him as "the founder and leader of PMC Wagner". Further sanctions were implemented against the Wagner Group in September 2018, and July 2020. In December 2021, the EU imposed sanctions against the Wagner Group and eight individuals and three entities connected with it, for committing "serious human rights abuses, including torture and extrajudicial, summary or arbitrary executions and killings, or in destabilising activities in some of the countries they operate in, including Libya, Syria, Ukraine (Donbas) and the Central African Republic."

Following the Russian military invasion of Ukraine on 24 February 2022, Canada's Global Affairs, the United Kingdom's Home Office, the Australian government, the Japanese Foreign Ministry and New Zealand had sanctioned the group. In addition, in late January 2023, the United States announced it would designate Wagner as a "significant transnational criminal organization", enabling further tougher sanctions to be implemented against the group.

In early 2023, the United States was reported to be working with Egypt and the United Arab Emirates (UAE) to put pressure on the military leaders of Sudan and Libya to end their relationship with the Wagner Group and expel them from the countries. The Wagner Group had supported the UAE's and Saudi Arabia’s allies in Sudan and Libya. In addition, the Wagner PMCs in Libya were mainly funded by the UAE.

Activities

Ukraine

Wagner PMCs were first active in February 2014 in Crimea during Russia's 2014 annexation of the peninsula where they operated in line with regular Russian army units, disarmed the Ukrainian Army and took control over facilities. The takeover of Crimea was almost bloodless. The PMCs, along with the regular soldiers, were called "polite people" at the time due to their well-mannered behavior. They kept to themselves, carried weapons that were not loaded, and mostly made no effort to interfere with civilian life. Another name for them was "little green men" since they were masked, wearing unmarked green army uniforms and their origin was initially unknown.

After the takeover of Crimea, some 300 PMCs went to the Donbas region of eastern Ukraine where a conflict started between Ukrainian government and pro-Russian forces. With their help, the pro-Russian forces were able to destabilize government security forces in the region, immobilize operations of local government institutions, seize ammunition stores and take control of towns. The PMCs conducted sneak attacks, reconnaissance, intelligence-gathering and accompanied VIPs. The Wagner Group PMCs reportedly took part in the June 2014 Il-76 airplane shoot-down at Luhansk International Airport and the early 2015 Battle of Debaltseve, which involved one of the heaviest artillery bombardments in recent history, as well as reportedly hundreds of regular Russian soldiers.

Following the end of major combat operations, the PMCs were reportedly given the assignment to kill dissident pro-Russian commanders that were acting in a rebellious manner, according to the Russian nationalist Sputnik and Pogrom internet media outlet and the SBU. According to the SBU and the Russian media, Wagner also forced the reorganization and disarmament of Russian Cossack and other formations. The PMCs acted mostly in the LPR. The LPR accused Ukraine of committing the assassinations, while unit members of the commanders believed it was the LPR authorities who were behind the killings. Wagner left Ukraine and returned to Russia in autumn of 2015, with the start of the Russian military intervention in the Syrian Civil War.

In late November 2017, a power struggle erupted in the separatist Luhansk People's Republic in Eastern Ukraine between LPR President Igor Plotnitsky and the LPR's Interior Minister, Igor Kornet, who Plotnitsky ordered to be dismissed. During the turmoil, armed men in unmarked uniforms took up positions in the center of Luhansk. Some of the men belonged to Wagner, according to the Janes company. In the end, Plotnitsky resigned and LPR Security Minister Leonid Pasechnik was named acting leader "until the next elections." Plotnitsky reportedly fled to Russia and the LPR's People's Council unanimously approved Plotnitsky's resignation. As of October 2018, a few dozen PMCs remained in the Luhansk region, according to the SBU, to kill any people considered "undesirable by Russia".

The Times reported that the Wagner Group flew in more than 400 contractors from the Central African Republic in mid- to late-January 2022 on a mission to assassinate Ukrainian President Volodymyr Zelenskyy and members of his government, and thus to prepare the ground for Russia to take control for the Russian invasion of Ukraine, which started on 24 February 2022. A US official stated that there were "some indications" that Wagner was being employed, but it was not clear where or how much. By 3 March, according to The Times, Zelenskyy had survived three assassination attempts, two of which were allegedly orchestrated by the Wagner Group.

In late March, it was expected that the number of Wagner PMCs in Ukraine would be tripled from around 300 at the beginning of the invasion to at least 1,000, and that they were to be focused on the Donbas region of eastern Ukraine. In late April, a Russian military offensive to take the remainder of the Donbas region dubbed the Battle of Donbas was launched and Wagner PMCs took part in the Battle of Popasna, the capture of Svitlodarsk, Battle of Sievierodonetsk and the Battle of Lysychansk. During fighting near Popasna on 20 May, retired Major General Kanamat Botashev of the Russian Air Force was shot down while flying a Sukhoi Su-25 attack aircraft, reportedly for the Wagner Group.

During the invasion, Wagner PMCs also trained Russian servicemen before they were sent to the frontline.

From the beginning of July, inmates recruited by Wagner, including Prighozin personally, in Russian prisons started participating in the invasion of Ukraine. The inmates were offered 100,000 or 200,000 rubles and amnesty for six months of "voluntary service", or 5 million for their relatives if they died. On 5 January 2023, the first group of 24 prisoners recruited by Wagner to fight in Ukraine finished their six-month contracts and were released with full amnesty for their past crimes.

During the Battle of Bakhmut in late September, senior Wagner commander Aleksey Nagin was killed. Nagin previously fought with Wagner in Syria and Libya, and before that took part in the Second Chechen War and the Russo-Georgian War. He was posthumously awarded the title of Hero of the Russian Federation. On 22 December, Pentagon's John Kirby claimed that around 1,000 Wagner fighters were killed in fighting at Bakhmut during the previous weeks, including some 900 recruited convicts. Ukrainian soldiers and former convicts prisoners of war described the use of recruited convicts at Bakhmut as "bait", as poorly armed and briefly trained convicts were sent in human wave attacks to draw out and expose Ukrainian positions to attack by more experienced units or artillery.

In mid-January 2023, the Wagner Group captured the salt mine town of Soledar after heavy fighting. During the battle, Wagner reportedly surrounded Ukrainian troops in the center of the town. Hundreds of both Russian and Ukrainian troops were killed in the battle for Soledar. Several days later, Wagner captured Klishchiivka, south of Bakhmut, after which they continued advancing west of the settlement.

A US estimate mid-February 2023, put the number of Wagner PMC casualties in the invasion at about 30,000, of which about 9,000 killed. The US estimated that half of those deaths occurred since the middle of December, with 90 percent of Wagner fighters which had been killed since December being convicts. Concurrently, the UK Ministry of Defence estimated that convicts recruited by Wagner had experienced a casualty rate of up to 50 percent.

Syria

The presence of the PMCs in Syria was first reported in late October 2015, almost a month after the start of the Russian military intervention in the country's civil war, when between three and nine PMCs were killed in a rebel mortar attack on their position in Latakia province. It was reported that the Wagner Group was employed by the Russian Defense Ministry, even though private military companies are illegal in Russia. The Russian Defense Ministry dismissed the early reports by The Wall Street Journal about the Wagner Group's operations in Syria as an "information attack". However, sources within the Russian FSB and the Defense Ministry unofficially stated for RBTH that Wagner was supervised by the GRU.

Wagner PMCs were notably involved in both Palmyra offensives in 2016 and 2017, as well as the Syrian Army's campaign in central Syria in the summer of 2017 and the Battle of Deir ez-Zor in late 2017. They were in the role of frontline advisors, fire and movement coordinators, forward air controllers who provided guidance to close air support and "shock troops" alongside the Syrian Army.

Besides fighting ISIL militants, according to RBK TV, the PMCs trained a Syrian Army unit called the ISIS Hunters, which was also fully funded and trained by Russian special forces.

In early February 2018, the PMCs took part in a battle at the town of Khasham, in eastern Syria, which resulted in heavy casualties among Syrian government forces and the Wagner Group as they were engaged by United States air and artillery strikes, due to which the incident was billed by media as "the first deadly clash between citizens of Russia and the United States since the Cold War".

Subsequently, the Wagner Group took part in the Syrian military's Rif Dimashq offensive against the rebel-held Eastern Ghouta, east of Damascus. The whole Eastern Ghouta region was captured by government forces on 14 April 2018, effectively ending the near 7-year rebellion near Damascus.

The PMCs also took part in the Syrian Army's offensive in northwestern Syria that took place mid-2019.

As of late December 2021, Wagner PMCs were still taking part in military operations against ISIL cells in the Syrian desert.

Sudan
In an interview with The Insider in December 2017, veteran Russian officer Igor Strelkov said that Wagner PMCs were present in South Sudan and possibly Libya. Several days before the interview was published, Strelkov stated Wagner PMCs were being prepared to be sent from Syria to Sudan or South Sudan after Sudan's president, Omar al-Bashir, told Russia's president Putin that his country needed protection "from aggressive actions of the USA".

Two internal-conflicts have been raging in Sudan for years (in the region of Darfur and the states of South Kordofan and Blue Nile), while a civil war has been taking place in South Sudan since 2013. The head of the private Russian firm RSB-group said that he heard PMCs had already traveled to Sudan and had returned with a severe form of malaria. Several dozen PMCs from RSB-group were sent to Libya in early 2017, to an industrial facility near the city of Benghazi, in an area held by forces loyal to Field marshal Khalifa Haftar, to support demining operations. They left in February after completing their mission. The RSB-group was in Libya at the request of the Libyan Cement Company (LCC).

In mid-December, a video surfaced showing Wagner PMCs training members of the Sudanese military, thus confirming Wagner's presence in Sudan and not South Sudan. The PMCs were sent to Sudan to support it militarily against South Sudan and protect gold, uranium and diamond mines, according to Sergey Sukhankin, an associate expert at the ICPS and Jamestown Foundation fellow. Sukhankin stated that the protection of the mines was the "most essential commodity" and that the PMCs were sent to "hammer out beneficial conditions for the Russian companies".

The PMCs in Sudan reportedly numbered 300 and were working under the cover of "M Invest", a company linked to Yevgeny Prigozhin. "M Invest" signed a contract with the Russian Defense Ministry for the use of transport aircraft of the 223rd Flight Unit of the Russian Air Force and between April 2018 and February 2019, two aircraft of the 223rd made at least nine flights to the Sudanese capital of Khartoum. The Wagner contractors in Sudan included former Ukrainian citizens who were recruited in Crimea, according to the SBU. In 2018, 500 PMCs were reported to have been sent to Sudan's Darfur region to train the military.

In late January 2019, after protests erupted in Sudan mid-December 2018, the British press made allegations that the PMCs were helping the Sudanese authorities crackdown on the protesters. During the first days of the protests, demonstrators and journalists reported groups of foreigners had gathered near major rallying points. This was denied by the Russian Foreign Ministry, although it confirmed contractors were in Sudan to train the Sudanese army. The SBU named 149 PMCs it said participated in the suppression of the protests, as well as two that were reportedly killed in the clashes. Between 30 and 40 people were killed during the protests, including two security personnel. More than 800 protesters were detained. Meanwhile, France accused the PMCs of having a "strong, active presence" on social media and that they were pushing a strong "anti-French rhetoric" in the CAR.

Following Omar al-Bashir's eventual overthrow in a coup d'état on 11 April 2019, Russia continued to support the Transitional Military Council (TMC) that was subsequently established to govern Sudan, as the TMC agreed to uphold Russia's contracts in Sudan's defense, mining and energy sectors. This included the PMCs' training of Sudanese military officers. The Wagner Group's operations became more elusive following al-Bashir's overthrow and they continued to mostly work with Sudan's Rapid Support Forces (RSF). Wagner was said to be linked to the Deputy Chairman of the TMC and commander of the RSF, Gen. Mohamed Hamdan Dagalo. In May, Russia signed a military agreement with Sudan which, among other things, would facilitate the entry of Russian warships to Sudanese ports. Additionally, a new draft agreement was signed in November 2020, that would lead to the establishment of a Russian naval logistic center and repair yard that on Sudan's Red Sea coast would host up to 300 people. The agreement is expected to stand for 25 years unless either party objects to its renewal.

In April 2020, the Wagner-connected company "Meroe Gold" was reported to be planning to ship personal protective equipment, medicine, and other equipment to Sudan amid the coronavirus pandemic. Three months later, the United States sanctioned the "M Invest" company, as well as its Sudan subsidiary "Meroe Gold" and two individuals key to Wagner operations in Sudan, for the suppression and discrediting of protesters.

Following the October–November 2021 Sudanese coup d'état, Russian support for the military administration set up in Sudan became more open and Russian-Sudanese ties, along with Wagner's activities, continued to expand even after Russia's invasion of Ukraine in 2022, leading to condemnation by the United States, United Kingdom and Norway. Further to the east, Wagner was supporting Russia's attempts to build a naval base on the Red Sea, while it was also using western Sudan's Darfur region as a staging point for its operations in other neighboring countries (the Central African Republic, Libya and parts of Chad). Geologists of the Wagner-linked "Meroe Gold" company also visited Darfur to assess its uranium potential.

Central African Republic
In 2018, the Russian private military company (PMC) Wagner deployed its personnel to the CAR, ostensibly to protect lucrative mines, support the CAR government, and provide close protection for the president, Faustin-Archange Touadéra. The PMCs were also supposed to fill the security vacuum left by France's withdrawal. However, their deployment came despite the active arms embargo in place since 2013.

By May 2018, it was reported that the number of Wagner PMCs in the CAR was 1,400, while another Russian PMC called Patriot was in charge of protecting VIPs. Wagner's presence in the country has been controversial, with some accusing them of human rights abuses and exacerbating the conflict. The Russian government has denied any involvement, saying that the PMCs are working on their own.

In December 2018, the Ukrainian Security Service reported that the umbrella structure of Wagner in the CAR is a commercial firm affiliated with Yevgeny Prigozhin – M-Finance LLC Security Service from St. Petersburg, whose main areas of activity are mining of precious stones and private security services. According to the SBU, some of the PMCs were transported to Africa directly on Prigozhin's private aircraft. Prigozhin is a close ally of Russian President Vladimir Putin and has been sanctioned by the US government for his alleged involvement in election interference and other malign activities.

By 2021, the situation in the CAR had deteriorated further, with rebels attacking and capturing the fourth-largest city in the country. In response, Russia sent an additional 300 military instructors to the country to train government forces and provide support. The presence of Wagner and other Russian PMCs in the CAR has raised concerns about Russia's growing influence in Africa and its willingness to flout international law.

In September 2022, The Daily Beast interviewed survivors and witnesses of yet another massacre committed by the Wagner Group in Bèzèrè village in December 2021, which involved torture, killing and disembowelment of a number of women, including pregnant ones.

In mid-January 2023, the Wagner Group sustained relatively heavy casualties as a new government military offensive was launched near the CAR border with Cameroon and Chad. Fighting also erupted near the border with Sudan. The rebels claimed between seven and 17 Wagner PMCs were among the dozens of casualties. A CAR military source also confirmed seven Wagner contractors were killed in one ambush.

Corporate activities 
According to a 2022 joint investigation and report from European Investigative Collaborations (EIC), the French organization All Eyes on Wagner, and the UK-based Dossier Center, Wagner Group has been controlling Diamville diamond trading company in Central African Republic since 2019.

Madagascar
The independent media group the Project reported that Wagner PMCs arrived in Madagascar in April 2018, to guard political consultants that were hired by Yevgeny Prigozhin to accompany the presidential campaign of then-president Hery Rajaonarimampianina for the upcoming elections. Rajaonarimampianina lost the attempt at re-election, finishing third during the first round of voting, although Prigozhin's consultants were said to had also worked with several of the other candidates in the months before the elections. Close to the end of the campaign, the strategists also helped the eventual winner of the elections, Andry Rajoelina, who was also supported by the United States and China. One of the last acts of Rajaonarimampianina's administration was said to be to facilitate a Russian firm's takeover of Madagascar's national chromite producer "Kraoma" and Wagner PMCs were reported to be guarding the chrome mines as of October 2018.

Among the consultants to the different presidential candidates was also Konstantin Pikalov, who was initially assigned as campaign security chief to candidate Pastor Mailhol of Madagascar's Church of the Apocalypse. However, when it was clear Andry Rajoelina was the favorite to win the election, Pikalov was transferred to be Rajoelina's bodyguard.

Libya

The group's presence in Libya was first reported in October 2018, when The Sun claimed that Russian military bases had been set up in Benghazi and Tobruk in support of Field Marshal Khalifa Haftar, who leads the Libyan National Army (LNA). The group was said to be providing training and support to Haftar's forces, and Russian missiles and SAM systems were also thought to be set up in Libya.

The Russian government denied the report, but RBK TV confirmed the Russian military deployment to Libya. By early March 2019, around 300 Wagner PMCs were in Benghazi supporting Haftar, according to a British government source. The LNA made large advances in the country's south, capturing a number of towns in quick succession, including the city of Sabha and Libya's largest oil field. Following the southern campaign, the LNA launched an offensive against the Government of National Accord (GNA)-held capital of Tripoli, but the offensive stalled within two weeks on the outskirts of the city due to stiff resistance.

Reports suggested that Russian mercenaries from the Wagner Group were fighting on the side of Haftar's forces, providing artillery support, using snipers, and laying mines and improvised explosive devices. They were also said to be equipped with laser-guided howitzer shells and using hollow point ammunition in contravention of rules of war. A Wagner headquarters was set up at a hospital in the town of Esbia, where the PMCs were stated to have detained and shot the family of a man who had stumbled upon the contractors by mistake. The GNA stated that two Russians who were arrested by their forces in early July were employed by the Wagner Group, and were involved in "securing a meeting" with Saif al-Islam Gaddafi.

By mid-November, the number of Wagner PMCs in Libya had risen to 1,400, according to several Western officials. The US Congress was preparing bipartisan sanctions against the PMCs in Libya, and a US military drone was shot down over Tripoli, with the US claiming it was shot down by Russian air defenses operated by Russian PMCs or the LNA. An estimated 25 Wagner military personnel were killed in a drone strike in September 2020, although the Russian government denied any involvement. The GNA ultimately recaptured Tripoli in June 2020, leading to a ceasefire agreement in October 2020.

On 31 May 2022, Human Rights Watch stated that information from Libyan agencies and demining groups linked the Wagner Group to the use of banned landmines and booby traps in Libya. These mines killed at least three Libyan deminers before the mines’ locations were identified.

Venezuela
In late January 2019, Wagner PMCs were reported by Reuters to have arrived in Venezuela during the presidential crisis that was unfolding. They were sent to provide security for President Nicolás Maduro who was facing U.S.-backed opposition protests as part of the socioeconomic and political crisis that had been gripping the country since 2010. The leader of a local chapter of a paramilitary group of Cossacks with ties to the PMCs reported that about 400 contractors may be in Venezuela at that point. It was said that the PMCs flew in two chartered aircraft to Havana, Cuba, from where they transferred onto regular commercial flights to Venezuela. An anonymous Russian source close to the Wagner Group stated that another group of PMCs had already arrived in advance of the May 2018 presidential election. Before the 2019 flare-up of protests, the PMCs were in Venezuela to mostly provide security for Russian business interests like the Russian energy company Rosneft. They also assisted in the training of the Venezuelan National Militia and the pro-Maduro Colectivos paramilitaries in 2018. Russian ambassador to Venezuela, Vladimir Zayemsky denied the report of the existence of Wagner in Venezuela.

Mozambique
In early August 2019, the Wagner Group received a contract with the government of Mozambique over two other private military companies, OAM and Black Hawk, by offering their services for lower costs. At the end of that month, the government of Mozambique approved a resolution ratifying the agreement from April 2018 on the entry of Russian military ships into national ports. On 13 September 160 PMCs from the Wagner Group arrived on a Russian An-124 cargo plane in the country to provide technical and tactical assistance to the Mozambique Defence Armed Forces (FADM) and were stationed in three military barracks in the northern provinces of Nampula, Macomia and Mueda.

On 25 September, a second Russian cargo plane landed in Nampula province and unloaded large-calibre weapons and ammunition belonging to the Wagner Group, which were then transported to the Cabo Delgado province where, from 5 October 2017, an Islamist insurgency had been taking place. At least one of the two cargo planes belonged to the 224th Flight Unit of the Russian Air Force. Overall, 200 PMCs, including elite troops, three attack helicopters and crew arrived in Mozambique to provide the training and combat support in Cabo Delgado, where the Islamist militants had burned villages, carried out beheadings and displaced hundreds of people.

Starting on 5 October, the Mozambique military conducted several successful operations, in collaboration with the PMCs, against the insurgents along the border with Tanzania. At the start of the operations, a PMC unit commander with the call sign "Granit" was killed and two other PMCs were wounded when their unit was ambushed by a force of 60 insurgents. During these operations, the military and the PMCs bombed insurgent bases in two areas, pushing them into the woods. At this time, the insurgents launched attacks on two bases, during which more than 35 insurgents and three PMCs were killed. Meanwhile, on 8 October, a Russian ship entered the port of Nacala carrying just over 17 containers of different types of weapons, especially explosives, which were transported to the battlefield. Russia, on its part, denied it had any troops in Mozambique.

Following the arrival of the PMCs, ISIL reinforced jihadist forces in Mozambique, leading to an increase in the number of militant attacks. On 10 and 27 October, two ambushes took place during which seven PMCs were killed. During the ambush at the end of October, in addition to five PMCs, 20 Mozambique soldiers also died when Islamic militants set up a barricade on the road as a FADM military convoy arrived. Four of the five PMCs were shot dead and then beheaded. Three vehicles were burned in the attack. Some of the deaths during the fighting in Mozambique were reportedly the result of a "friendly fire" incident.

By mid-November, two Mozambique military sources described growing tensions between Wagner and the FADM after a number of failed military operations, with one saying joint patrols had almost stopped. Analysts, mercenaries and security experts, including the heads of OAM and Black Hawk, which operate in Sub-Saharan Africa, were of the opinion that Wagner was struggling in Mozambique since they were operating in a theater where they did not have much expertise. According to John Gartner, the head of OAM and a former Rhodesian soldier, the Wagner Group was "out of their depth" in Mozambique. At the same time, Dolf Dorfling, the founder of Black Hawk and a former South African colonel, said sources told them that the Wagner Group had started to search for local military expertise.

Towards the end of that month, it was reported that 200 PMCs had withdrawn from Mozambique, following the deaths among its fighters. Still, as of the end of November, Russian fighters and equipment were still present in the port city of Pemba and they were also based in the coastal town of Mocímboa da Praia. The PMCs had also withdrawn to Nacala to re-organize.

By early 2020, the number of attacks in Cabo Delgado surged, with 28 taking place throughout January and early February. The violence spread to nine of the province's 16 districts. The attacks included beheadings, mass kidnappings and villages burned to the ground. Most of the attacks were conducted by militants, but some were also made by bandits. On 23 March, the militants captured the key town of Mocimboa de Praia in Cabo Delgado. Two weeks later, the insurgents launched attacks against half a dozen villages in the province.

On 8 April, the military launched helicopter strikes against militant bases in two districts. Journalist Joseph Hanlon published a photograph showing one of the helicopter gunships that took part in the attack and said it was manned by Wagner PMCs. However, two other sources cited by the Daily Maverick stated the contractors belonged to the South African private military company Dyck Advisory Group (DAG) and that the Wagner Group had pulled out of Mozambique in March.

Mali

In mid-September 2021, according to diplomatic and security sources, an agreement was close to being finalized that would allow the Wagner Group to operate in Mali. According to conflicting sources, at least 1,000 PMCs or less would be deployed to Mali, which has been witnessing a civil war since 2012, and the Wagner Group would be paid about 6 billion CFA francs a month for training of the Malian military and providing protection for government officials. France, which previously ruled Mali as a colony, was making a diplomatic push to prevent the agreement being enacted. Since late May 2021, Mali has been ruled by a military junta that came into power following a coup d'état. In response, Mali's Prime Minister Choguel Kokalla Maïga in his address to the UN General Assembly stated "The new situation resulting from the end of Operation Barkhane puts Mali before a fait accompli – abandoning us, mid-flight to a certain extent – and it leads us to explore pathways and means to better ensure our security autonomously, or with other partners".

The United Kingdom, European Union and Ivory Coast also warned Mali not to engage in an agreement with the Wagner Group. Still, on 30 September, Mali received a shipment of four Mil Mi-17 helicopters, as well as arms and ammunition, as part of a contract agreed in December 2020. The shipment was received by Mali's Defence Minister, who praised Russia as "a friendly country with which Mali has always maintained a very fruitful partnership".

In late December, France published a joint statement also signed by the U.K., Germany, Canada and 11 other European governments that they have witnessed the deployment of the Wagner Group to Mali, with Russia's backing, and that they condemned the action. Mali denied the deployment, asking for proof by independent sources, but acknowledged "Russian trainers" were in the country as part of strengthening the military and security forces and that it was "only involved in a state-to-state partnership with the Russian Federation, its historical partner". French government sources stated the allegation of Wagner's deployment was based on factors that included the development of a new military base near Bamako's airport as well as "suspicious flight patterns". The following month, Malian army officials confirmed some 400 Russian military advisors had arrived in the country and were present in several parts of Mali. Several officials, including a Western one, stated Russian "mercenaries" were deployed in Mali, but a Malian military source denied this. Still, an official from central Mali, stated there was both Russian advisors and PMCs present and that not all of the contractors were Russian nationals. According to a French military official, between 300 and 400 PMCs were present in the central part of the country, along with Russian trainers who were providing equipment. Photos also emerged of the PMCs in the town of Ségou from the end of December 2021, where 200 Wagner contractors were reportedly deployed. In addition, it was reported that at the beginning of January 2022, clashes south of Mopti between the contractors and jihadists left one PMC dead.

In mid-January 2022, Wagner PMCs were deployed at a former French military base in Timbuktu, in northern Mali. Subsequently, the US Army also confirmed the presence of the Wagner Group in Mali. By early April 2022, some 200 Malian soldiers and 9 police officers were receiving training in Russia.

On 5 April 2022, Human Rights Watch published a report accusing Malian soldiers and Russian PMCs of executing around 300 civilians between 27 and 31 March, during a military operation in Moura, in the Mopti region, known as a hotspot of Islamic militants. According to the Malian military, more than 200 militants were killed in the operation, which reportedly involved more than 100 Russians. At the start of the operation on 27 March, Malian military helicopters landed near the town's market, after which soldiers were deployed and approached a group of around 30 jihadists, who fired at them, killing at least two "white soldiers", according to Human Rights Watch.

On 19 April 2022, the first officially confirmed death of a Russian military advisor, said to be a Wagner member, took place when a military patrol hit a roadside bomb near the town of Hombori.

On 22 April 2022, three days after the French military handed over the Gossi military base to Malian forces, France claimed suspected Wagner Group PMCs buried a dozen bodies in a mass grave a few kilometres east of the base soon after the withdrawal, with the intent of blaming France. The French military published video images appearing to show 10 white soldiers covering bodies with sand, two days after a "sensor observed a dozen Caucasian individuals, most likely belonging to the Wagner Group" and Malian soldiers arriving at the burial site to unload equipment, according to a French military report.

On 25 April 2022, the Al-Qaeda-linked JNIM jihadist organisation claimed it had captured a number of Wagner Group members at the beginning of the month in the central Ségou Region.

In late June 2022, accusations surfaced against the Wagner Group that PMCs were looting towns and indiscriminatly arresting people in the northern Tombouctou Region with the Malian military, forcing civilians to flee to Mauritania. Killings were also reported to have taken place.

Possible activities

Belarus
In July 2020, ahead of the country's presidential election, Belarusian law enforcement agencies arrested 33 Wagner contractors. The arrests took place after the security agencies received information about over 200 PMCs arriving in the country "to destabilize the situation during the election campaign", according to the state-owned Belarusian Telegraph Agency (BelTA). The Belarusian Security Council accused those arrested of preparing "a terrorist attack". The U.S.-funded Radio Liberty reported the contractors were possibly on their way to Sudan, citing video footage that showed Sudanese currency and a telephone card depicting Kassala's Khatmiya Mosque among the belongings of those who had been arrested. Others also believed the contractors were simply using Belarus as a staging post on their way to or from their latest assignment, possibly in Africa, with BBC News pointing out the footage of the Sudanese currency and a Sudanese phone card as well. Russia confirmed the men were employed by a private security firm, but stated they had stayed in Belarus after missing their connecting flight to Turkey and called for their swift release. The head of the Belarusian investigative group asserted the contractors had no plans to fly further to Turkey and that they were giving "contradictory accounts". The PMCs stated they were on their way to Venezuela, Turkey, Cuba and Syria. Belarusian authorities also said they believed the husband of opposition presidential candidate Sviatlana Tsikhanouskaya may have ties to the detained men and launched a criminal case against him. The detained contractors were returned to Russia two weeks later.

During the contractors' detention, Russian media reported that the Security Service of Ukraine had lured the PMCs to Belarus under the pretext of a contract for the protection of Rosneft facilities in Venezuela. The operation's plan was to force an emergency landing of the contractor's plane from Minsk as it flew through Ukrainian airspace and, once grounded, the PMCs would have been arrested. Later, Russian president Putin also stated that the detained men were victims of a joint Ukrainian-United States intelligence operation. Although the Ukrainian president's chief of staff, Andriy Yermak, denied involvement in the detentions, subsequently, a number of Ukrainian journalists, members of parliament, and politicians confirmed the operation. The operation was supposedly planned for a year as Ukraine identified PMCs who fought in eastern Ukraine and were involved in the July 2014 shoot down of Malaysia Airlines Flight 17. The operation failed after being postponed by the Office of the President of Ukraine, which was reportedly informed of it only in its final stage. Ukrainian reporter Yuri Butusov accused Andriy Yermak of "betrayal" after he reportedly deliberately released information on the operation to Russia. Butusov further reported that the Turkish intelligence agency MİT was also involved in the operation. The failure of the operation led to firings and criminal proceedings among Ukraine's Security Service personnel, according to a Ukrainian intelligence representative using the pseudonym "Bogdan". Former Ukrainian President Petro Poroshenko also claimed in December 2020 that he sanctioned the operation at the end of 2018.

Nagorno-Karabakh
Several days after Russian media reported that Russian PMCs were ready to fight against Azerbaijan in Nagorno-Karabakh, a source within the Wagner Group, as well as Russian military analyst Pavel Felgenhauer, reported Wagner contractors were sent to support armed forces of the partially recognized Republic of Artsakh against Azerbaijan during the 2020 Nagorno-Karabakh war as ATGM operators. However, Bellingcat reported that the Wagner Group was not present in Nagorno-Karabakh, pointing to the Reverse Side of the Medal (RSOTM) public channel, used by Russian PMCs, including Wagner. RSOTM posted two images and a song alluding to the possibility of Wagner PMCs arriving in Nagorno-Karabakh, but Bellingcat determined the images were unrelated.

Following the end of the war, retired military captain Viktor Zlobov stated Wagner PMCs took a significant role in managing to preserve the territory that remained under Armenian control during the conflict and were the ones mostly responsible for the Armenians managing to keep control of the town of Shusha for as long as they did before it was ultimately captured by Azerbaijan during the major battle that took place. Turkey reported that 380 "blondes with blue eyes" took part in the conflict on the side of Artsakh, while some Russian publications put the number of Wagner PMCs who arrived in the region in early November at 500. 300 of these were said to have taken part in the Battle of Shusha and a photo of a Wagner PMC, apparently taken in front a church in Shusha during the war, appeared on the internet the following month.

The Russian news outlet OSN reported the arrival of the PMCs was also one of the factors that led to Azerbaijan's halt of their offensive against Nagorno-Karabakh.

Burkina Faso
Following more than six years of a Jihadist insurgency in Burkina Faso, a coup d'état took place on 23 January 2022, with the military deposing president Roch Marc Christian Kaboré and declaring that the parliament, government and constitution had been dissolved. The coup d'état was led by lieutenant colonel Paul-Henri Sandaogo Damiba and came in response to the government's failure to suppress the Islamist insurgency, which has left 2,000 people dead and between 1.4 and 1.5 million displaced. Anger was also directed towards France, which was providing military support to the government.

One day after the coup, Alexander Ivanov, the official representative of Russian military trainers in the CAR, offered training to the Burkinese military. Subsequently, it was revealed that shortly before the military takeover lieutenant colonel Damiba attempted to persuade president Kaboré to engage the Wagner Group against the Islamist insurgents. In addition, less than two weeks before the takeover, the government announced it had thwarted a coup plot, after which it was speculated that the Wagner Group might try and establish itself in Burkina Faso. The coup found significant support in the country and was followed by protests against France and in support of the takeover, with the protesters calling for Russia to intervene. The United States Department of Defense stated it was aware of allegations that the Wagner Group might have been "a force behind the military takeover in Burkina Faso" but could not confirm if they were true.

On 30 September 2022, a new coup d'état took place that saw colonel Damiba being deposed by captain Ibrahim Traoré due to Damiba's inability to contain the jihadist insurgency. According to Traoré, he and other officers had tried to get Damiba to "refocus" on the rebellion, but eventually opted to overthrow him as "his ambitions were diverting away from what we set out to do". Some suspected Traoré of having a connection with Wagner. As Traoré entered Ouagadougou, the nation's capital, supporters cheered, some waving Russian flags. The Government of Ghana publicly alleged that Traoré began collaborating with the Wagner Group following the coup, enlisting the mercenaries against the jihadist rebels. According to Ghana's President, the ruling junta allocated a mine to the Wagner Group as a form of payment for its deployment, which was denied by Burkina Faso's mines minister. In late January 2023, the ruling junta demanded France withdraw its troops, numbering between 200 and 400 special forces members, from Burkina Faso, after battling the jihadists for years. France agreed.

Serbia

A Russian news video claiming to show Serbian "volunteers" being training by the Wagner Group to fight alongside Russian troops in Ukraine has prompted outrage in Serbia. Serbia's president, Aleksandar Vucic, reacted angrily on national TV, asking why the Wagner Group would call on anyone from Serbia when it is against the country's regulations. It is illegal for Serbians to take part in conflicts abroad.

Moldova

Amid reports claiming Russia was plotting the toppling of the government of Moldova, and a subsequent anti-government demonstration, the Moldovan Border Police reported it had detained and deported an alleged member of the Wagner Group at Chisinau Airport.

Casualties

Families of killed PMCs are prohibited from talking to the media under a non-disclosure that is a prerequisite for them to get compensation from the company. The standard compensation for the family of a killed Wagner employee is up to 5 million rubles (about 80,000 dollars), according to a Wagner official. In contrast, the girlfriend of a killed fighter stated the families are paid between 22,500 and 52,000 dollars depending on the killed PMC's rank and mission. In mid-2018, Russian military veterans urged the Russian government to acknowledge sending private military contractors to fight in Syria, in an attempt to secure financial and medical benefits for the PMCs and their families.

The Sogaz International Medical Centre in Saint Petersburg, a clinic owned by the large insurance company AO Sogaz, has treated PMCs who had been injured in combat overseas since 2016. The company's senior officials and owners are either relatives of Russian President Putin or others linked to him. The clinic's general director, Vladislav Baranov, also has a business relationship with Maria Vorontsova, Putin's eldest daughter.

Awards and honors
Wagner PMCs have received state awards in the form of military decorations and certificates signed by Russian President Putin. Wagner commanders Andrey Bogatov and Andrei Troshev were awarded the Hero of the Russian Federation honor for assisting in the first capture of Palmyra in March 2016. Bogatov was seriously injured during the battle. Meanwhile, Alexander Kuznetsov and Dmitry Utkin had reportedly won the Order of Courage four times. Family members of killed PMCs also received medals from Wagner itself, with the mother of one killed fighter being given two medals, one for "heroism and valour" and the other for "blood and bravery". A medal for conducting operations in Syria was also issued by Wagner to its PMCs.

In mid-December 2017, a powerlifting tournament was held in Ulan-Ude, capital city of the Russian Republic of Buryatia, which was dedicated to the memory of Vyacheslav Leonov, a Wagner PMC who was killed during the campaign in Syria's Deir ez-Zor province. The same month, Russia's president signed a decree establishing International Volunteer Day in Russia, as per the UN resolution from 1985, which will be celebrated annually every 5 December. The Russian Poliksal news site associated the Russian celebration of Volunteer Day with honoring Wagner PMCs.

In late January 2018, an image emerged of a monument in Syria, dedicated to "Russian volunteers". The inscription on the monument in Arabic read: "To Russian volunteers, who died heroically in the liberation of Syrian oil fields from ISIL". The monument was located at the Haiyan plant, about 50 kilometers from Palmyra, where Wagner PMCs were deployed. An identical monument was also erected in Luhansk in February 2018. In late August 2018, a chapel was built near Goryachy Klyuch, Krasnodar Krai, in Russia in memory of Wagner PMCs killed in fighting against ISIL in Syria. For each of those killed a candle is lit in the chapel. Towards the end of November 2018, it was revealed that a third monument, also identical to the two in Syria and Luhansk, was erected in front of the chapel, which is a few dozen kilometers from the PMC's training facility at Molkin.

The leadership of the Wagner Group and its military instructors were reportedly invited to attend the military parade on 9 May 2018, dedicated to Victory Day.

On 14 May 2021, a Russian movie inspired by the Russian military instructors in the Central African Republic premiered at the national stadium in Bangui. Titled The Tourist, it depicts a group of Russian military advisors sent to the CAR on the eve of presidential elections and, following a violent rebellion, they defend locals against the rebels. The movie was reportedly financed by Yevgeny Prigozhin to improve the Wagner Group's reputation and included some Wagner PMCs as extras. Six months later, a monument to the Russian military was erected in Bangui. In late January 2022, a second movie about the Russian PMCs had its premiere. The film, titled Granit, showed the true story of the contractors' mission to the Cabo Delgado region of Mozambique in 2019, against Islamist militants.

Deaths of journalists

Death of Maksim Borodin

On 12 April 2018, investigative Russian journalist Maksim Borodin was found badly injured at the foot of his building, after falling from his fifth-floor balcony in Yekaterinburg. He was subsequently hospitalized in a coma and died of his injuries three days later on 15 April. In the weeks before his death, Borodin gained national attention when he wrote about the deaths of Wagner PMCs in the battle with US-backed forces in eastern Syria in early February, that also involved U.S. air-strikes. Throughout February and March, Borodin interviewed relatives and commanders of Wagner Group PMCs, and attended their funerals in the town of Asbest.

Local officials said no suicide note was found but that his death was unlikely to be of a criminal nature. They also stated that at the time of his fall his apartment door had been locked from the inside, indicating that nobody had either entered or left. Although the police continued their investigation, they were not treating his death as suspicious. However, Polina Rumyantseva, chief editor of Novy Den, where Borodin worked, said before he died that she could not rule out a crime and that there was no reason for him to commit suicide. Harlem Désir of the OSCE said the death was "of serious concern" and called for a thorough investigation. Borodin's friend stated that one day before his fall, Borodin had contacted him at five o'clock in the morning saying there was "someone with a weapon on his balcony and people in camouflage and masks on the staircase landing". He had been attempting to find a lawyer, but later Borodin called his friend once again and said he made a mistake and that he thought the men had been taking part in some kind of training exercise. After Borodin's death, Rumyantseva stated that Novy Den had been in his apartment and that there were no signs of a struggle, while the investigators thought that Borodin had gone on the balcony to smoke and had fallen. Still, Rumyantseva stated "If there's even a hint of something criminal, we will make it public". Borodin also had a local repute for conducting investigation of prisons and corrupt officials in his native Sverdlovsk Oblast.

Central African Republic
On 30 July 2018, three Russian journalists (Kirill Radchenko,  and ) belonging to the Russian online news organisation Investigation Control Centre (TsUR), which is linked to Mikhail Khodorkovsky, were ambushed and killed by unknown assailants in the Central African Republic, three days after they had arrived in the country to investigate local Wagner activities. The ambush took place 23 kilometers from Sibut when armed men emerged from the bush and opened fire on their vehicle. The journalists' driver survived the attack, but was afterward kept incommunicado by the authorities. In its response to the killings, Russia's foreign ministry noted that the dead journalists had been traveling without official accreditation.

BBC News and AFP said the circumstances of their deaths were unclear. According to the Interfax news agency, robbery could have been a motive. An expensive camera kit and more than 8,000 dollars disappeared from the scene, although three canisters of gasoline, which is considered a valuable commodity in the CAR, were left in the vehicle. A local official and their driver stated that the attackers were wearing turbans and speaking Arabic. Russian and CAR state media initially reported that the authorities suspected Seleka rebels to be behind the killings. According to local residents, interviewed by Khodorkovsky's investigators, around 10 people had camped out nearby before the ambush, waiting there for several hours. Shortly before the attack, they saw another car with "three armed white men ... and two Central Africans" pass by. Per an initial report in The New York Times, there was no indication that the killings were connected with the journalists' investigation of the Wagner Group's activities in the Central African Republic, but a follow-up article cited a Human Rights Watch researcher who commented that "Many things don't add up" in regards to the mysterious killings. It reaffirmed there was nothing to contradict the official version that the killings were a random act by thieves, but noted speculation within Russia that blamed the Wagner Group, while also adding a theory by a little known African news media outlet that France, which previously ruled the CAR when it was a colony, was behind the killings as a warning to Moscow to stay clear of its area of influence. Moscow-based defence analyst Pavel Felgenhauer thought it was unlikely they were killed by Wagner's PMCs, while the Security Service of Ukraine claimed that it had evidence about the PMCs involvement.

During their investigation, the journalists tried to enter the PMCs' camp, but they were told that they needed accreditation from the country's Defense Ministry. The accreditation was previously only given to an AFP journalist who was still not allowed to take any photographs or interview anyone. The killings took place one day after the journalists visited the Wagner Group encampment at Berengo. According to Bellingcat's Christo Grozev, after the journalists arrived in the CAR, the Wagner Group's Col. Konstantin Pikalov issued a letter describing how they should be followed and spied on.

According to the Dozhd television station, the Russian private military company Patriot was involved in the killings.

In January 2019, it was revealed that, according to evidence gathered by Khodorkovsky's Dossier Center, a major in the Central African Gendarmerie was involved in the ambush. The major was in regular communication with the journalists' driver on the day of their murders and he had frequent communications with a Wagner PMC who was a specialist trainer in counter-surveillance and recruitment in Central Africa. The police officer was also said to have attended a camp run by Russian military trainers on the border with Sudan, and maintained regular contact with Russian PMCs after his training. The investigation into the murders by the Dossier Center was suspended two months later due to lack of participation by government agencies and organizations.

Notable members 
 Vladimir Andanov was wanted for a killing in Libya. Andanov was reportedly killed by a Ukrainian sniper in Ukraine.
 Andrey Medvedev (mercenary)

See also
 Academi – American private military company
 Belligerents in the Syrian civil war
 Diamville
 Kadyrovtsy
 Military history of the Russian Federation
 Mozart Group
 Murder of Yevgeny Nuzhin
 Patriot (PMC)
 Redut (PMC)
 Rashism

Notes

Explanatory notes

Citations

General and cited sources

Further reading

External links

 

 
Military units and formations of the 2022 Russian invasion of Ukraine
Paramilitary organizations based in Russia
Private military contractors
Pro-government factions of the Syrian civil war
Pro-Russian militant groups
Russian entities subject to the U.S. Department of the Treasury sanctions
Russian mercenaries
Russian military intervention in the Syrian civil war
Russian war crimes
Separatist forces of the war in Donbas
Transnational organized crime
War crimes
Organizations designated as terrorist by Lithuania